The  Mall of Qatar is a shopping mall that opened in December 2016 in the Rawdat Al Jahhaniya district of Al Rayyan, Qatar.

History
In December 2013, the engineering company Drake & Scull Qatar was awarded the mechanical, electrical and plumbing work in the Mall of Qatar. The cost for the construction of the mall was initially set around $660 million, but was increased to $1.48 billion in October 2015 after new hospitality and entertainment projects were added along the way. Deals were signed with Abu Issa Holding to bring retail luxury goods among its offering, with M.H. Alshaya Co. to bring lifestyle and hospitality brands to the mall., with IMAX for the cineplex, and with the Majid Al Futtaim Group to  add a Carrefour hypermarket to the mall.

On the day it opened, 220 stores were operating in the mall. The opening was patronized by the sheikh Hamad Bin Khalifa Al Thani.

In 2017, The Mall was awarded RLI International Retail & Leisure Destination Global Award. In 2020, expansion plans were announced that included 1,000 luxury residential units, a Sherborne School and a theme park. In December 2020, the Ahmed bin Ali Stadium adjacent to the mall was inaugurated.

During the COVID-19 pandemic, for several months, the tenants of the mall were exempted from paying rent to cope with the lockdown situation.

Description
The Mall of Qatar is a 464,515 sqm, 3-floor shopping mall located in the Rawdat Al Jahhaniya district of Al Rayyan, Qatar. The high central glassed dome is eight floors high.

The Mall of Qatar is adjacent to the Ahmed bin Ali Stadium, one of the host stadiums in the 2022 FIFA World Cup.

Incidents
On 2 April 2016, while under construction, the Mall of Qatar caught fire. All the 14,000 workers were evacuated safely. Another fire broke out on 30 October 2016 while the mall was still under construction.

References

External links

Shopping malls in Al Rayyan
Shopping malls established in 2016
Rawdat Al Jahhaniya